False Impressions is a 1797 melodramatic comedy play by the British playwright Richard Cumberland. It was first staged at the Covent Garden Theatre in November 1797. Much of the plot resembles Cumberland's 1795 novel Henry. Algernon has to pretend to be a servant to restore his good name.

The original cast included John Quick as Scud, Joseph George Holman as Algernon, Joseph Shepherd Munden as Simon Single, Charles Murray as Sir Oliver Monrath, John Whitfield as Earling, Julia Betterton as Emily Fitzallan and Mary Ann Davenport as Mrs Buckram.

References

Bibliography
 Nicoll, Allardyce. A History of English Drama 1660-1900. Volume III: Late Eighteenth Century Drama. Cambridge University Press, 1952.

Plays by Richard Cumberland
1797 plays
West End plays
Comedy plays